Chad competed at the 2020 Summer Olympics in Tokyo. Originally scheduled to take place from 24 July to 9 August 2020, the Games were postponed to 23 July to 8 August 2021, because of the COVID-19 pandemic. The country's participation in Tokyo marks its thirteenth appearance at the Summer Olympics since its debut in 1964.

Competitors
The following is the list of number of competitors in the Games.

Archery

Chad initially secured a quota place in the men's individual recurve, by finishing in the top two, among those not already qualified, at the 2019 African Games in Rabat, Morocco, but failed to meet the score standard. Another Chadian archer received an invitation from the Tripartite Commission and World Archery to compete in the women's individual recurve at the Games, signifying the country's debut in the sport.

Athletics

Chad received a universality slot from the World Athletics to send a male track and field athlete to the Olympics.

Track & road events

Judo

Chad qualified one judoka for the women's middleweight category (70 kg) at the Games. Demos Memneloum accepted a continental berth from Africa as the nation's top-ranked judoka outside of direct qualifying position in the IJF World Ranking List of June 28, 2021.

References

External links
 Chad at the 2020 Summer Olympics at Olympedia

Nations at the 2020 Summer Olympics
2020
Olympics